Criminal Minds: Beyond Borders is an American police procedural that debuted on CBS on March 16, 2016. The series is a spin-off of another series Criminal Minds aired on the same network, and is the third show in the Criminal Minds franchise. Criminal Minds: Beyond Borders follows an elite team of profilers and agents from the FBI's International Response Team (IRT).  This team solves cases that involve American citizens in trouble on international soil. CBS aired a backdoor pilot on an episode of Criminal Minds on April 8, 2015, introducing the characters with a crossover episode eponymously titled "Beyond Borders". The series follows special agents Jack Garrett, Clara Seger, Matthew Simmons, Russ Montgomery and Mae Jarvis. On May 16, 2016, CBS renewed the series for a second and final season, which premiered on March 8, 2017.

A total of 26 episodes of Criminal Minds: Beyond Borders aired over two seasons.

Series overview

Episodes

Backdoor pilot (2015) 
The program and its characters are introduced during the tenth season of Criminal Minds. The Criminal Minds episode, "Beyond Borders", served as a backdoor pilot episode for the show.

Season 1 (2016)

Season 2 (2017)

Home releases

References 

Criminal Minds: Beyond Borders
Episodes